Destroy All Nels Cline is an album by American guitarist Nels Cline which was released in April 2001 on the Atavistic label.

Reception

The AllMusic review by Don Snowden states, "You won't hear Nels Cline individually to his best advantage here because the music is so dense and detail-packed it's hard to tell the soloists and the players apart. Which just may be the reason he wanted to do the project and name the disc Destroy All Nels Cline -- to escape from any personality focus, and get back to collective music making. It's tough stuff, but if you like seriously electric guitar improvisation and/or Sonic Youth and their ilk's more experimental forays, there are plenty of rewards here". All About Jazz stated "Take it or leave it. Destroy All Nels Cline offers surprisingly effective sonic therapy for the open-minded—and probably only a bad headache for the rest. You'll have to decide if it's going to work for you. This pair of ears gives it two thumbs up".

Track listing
All compositions by Nels Cline
 "Spider Wisdom" - 7:32
 "Chi Cacoan" - 6:28
 "The Ringing Hand" - 9:10
 "Talk of Chocolate Bed" - 9:58
 "After Armenia" - 5:59
 "Progression" - 4:56
 "As in Life  (In Memory Of Horace Tapscott)" - 14:42    
 "Friends of Snowman" - 4:38
 "Martyr" - 12:21

Personnel
 Nels Cline – electric guitars
G. E. Stinson, Woodward Lee Aplanalp - electric guitar
Carla Bozulich - electric guitar, sampling keyboard
Bob Mair - electric bass guitar, electric guitar
Zeena Parkins - electric harp
Wayne Peet - clarinet, mellotron
Alex Cline - drums, percussion

References

2001 albums
Nels Cline albums
Atavistic Records albums